Habel can refer to:

 an alternate spelling of biblical figure Abel, of the brothers Cain and Abel
 Dorothy Habel, American historian
 Sarah Habel, American actress
 St. Habel of Kaipetta, Indian convert from Hinduism to Christianity
Surnames from given names